La Calle de las Sirenas is the second studio album by Mexican pop group, Kabah and their most successful album to date. It was released in 1996. Most of the songs were written by the band members and Fitte, their personal manager, the album went straight to number one in Mexico and Argentina.

"La Calle de las Sirenas", was the lead single of the album, which was released in the spring of 1996 and peaked 10 consecutive weeks at the number one position on the Mexican Top 40 Charts, it also provided to the band their breakout single all around Hispanic-America; it also was Top 10 in Japan. It was the second biggest hit of the year in Mexico only behind of the smash teen-pop hit Azúcar amargo by Fey.

Then came in the same 1996 with the second single, "Vive" while "Fuego de Gloria" was used as Televisa's theme of the 1996 Summer Olympic Games. Despite this, it wasn't included on the Voces Unidas soundtrack album to the 1996 Summer Olympics. It was however, released as the seventh and final single in early 1998.

Their fourth single "Estaré" was released in December 1996 and the music video was made in 1997, it also peaked at number one in Mexico and their fifth single "Amor de Estudiante" was released in January 1997, and became another number one hit for the band, which served as the main theme of the soap opera Mi Generación in that year; other singles included "Amor por Amor" and "Juntos". The members' look for this album was full of colors and energy directed.
 
Tracklist:

 La Calle De Las Sirenas
 Amor Por Amor
 Vivir
 Siempre Hay Una Solución
 Vive
 Sin Ti Yo No
 Júntos
 Fuego De Gloria
 Estaré
 Amor, Paz Y Enténdimiento
 Tú Risa Genial
 Amor De Estudiante (Amor de Verano)

References

1996 albums
Spanish-language albums